The Coca-Cola Twelve Hours of Sebring International Grand Prix of Endurance, was the second round of the 1979 IMSA GT Championship. The race was held at the Sebring International Raceway, on March 17, 1979. Victory overall went to the No. 9 Dick Barbour Racing Porsche 935 driven by Bob Akin, Rob McFarlin, and Roy Woods.

Race results
Class winners in bold.

Class Winners

References

12 Hours of Sebring
12 Hours of Sebring
12 Hours Of Sebring
12 Hours Of Sebring